Durahim Jamaluddin (born 13 February 1981 – 2 January 2018) was a Malaysian footballer who last played for Perlis FA. He was a member of the Malaysia national football team.

He previously played for Perlis FA and won the 2005 Malaysia Super League. With the Malaysia national team, he made his only appearance against Singapore in 2005 international matches. On 2 January 2018, almost 5 years after his retirement from football, Durahim died while on his way to Malacca Hospital, due to a heart attack.

References

External links
 

1981 births
2018 deaths
Malaysian footballers
Malaysia international footballers
Perlis FA players
People from Malacca

Association football defenders